Mahmoud Darwish (13 March 1941 – 9 August 2008) was a Palestinian poet and author who was regarded as  Palestine's national poet. He won numerous awards for his works. Darwish used Palestine as a metaphor for the loss of Eden, birth and resurrection, and the anguish of dispossession and exile. He has been described as incarnating and reflecting "the tradition of the political poet in Islam, the man of action whose action is poetry." He also served as an editor for several literary magazines in Palestine.

Biography
Mahmoud Darwish was born in 1941 in al-Birwa in the Western Galilee, the second child of Salim and Houreyyah Darwish. His family were landowners. His mother was illiterate, but his grandfather taught him to read. During the 1948 Arab-Israeli war, his village was captured by Israeli forces and the family fled to Lebanon, first to Jezzine and then Damour. Their home village was razed and destroyed by the IDF to prevent its inhabitants from returning to their homes inside the new Jewish state.

A year later, Darwish's family returned to the Acre area, which was now part of Israel, and settled in Deir al-Asad. Darwish attended high school in Kafr Yasif, two kilometers north of Jadeidi. He eventually moved to Haifa.

He published his first book of poetry, Asafir bila ajniha, or "Wingless Birds," at the age of 19. He initially published his poems in Al Jadid, the literary periodical of the Israeli Communist Party, eventually becoming its editor. Later, he was assistant editor of Al Fajr, a literary periodical published by the Israeli Workers Party (Mapam).

Darwish left Israel in 1970 to study in the Soviet Union (USSR). He attended the Lomonosov Moscow State University for one year, before moving to Egypt and Lebanon. When he joined the PLO (Palestine Liberation Organization) in 1973, he was banned from reentering Israel.

In 1995, he returned to attend the funeral of his colleague, Emile Habibi, receiving a permit to remain in Haifa for four days. That year Darwish was allowed to settle in Ramallah, but he said he felt he was living in exile there, and did not consider the West Bank his "private homeland."

Darwish was twice married and divorced. His first wife was the writer Rana Kabbani. After they divorced, in the mid-1980s, he married an Egyptian translator, Hayat Heeni. He had no children. The "Rita" of Darwish's poems was a Jewish woman whom he loved when he was living in Haifa; he revealed in an interview with French journalist Laure Adler that her name is Tamar Ben-Ami. The relationship was the subject of the film Write Down, I Am an Arab by filmmaker Ibtisam Mara'ana Menuhin, an Arab Muslim woman married to a Jewish man. (While such relationships are rare today, they were more common during the Palestinian Mandate period, and among communists, who were united by class struggle.)

Darwish had a history of heart disease, suffering a heart attack in 1984. He had two heart operations, in 1984 and 1998.

His final visit to Israel was on 15 July 2007, to attend a poetry recital at Mt. Carmel Auditorium in Haifa. There, he criticized the factional violence between Fatah and Hamas as a "suicide attempt in the streets."

Literary career
Over his lifetime, Darwish published more than 30 volumes of poetry and eight books of prose. At one time or another, he was editor of the periodicals Al-Jadid, Al Fajr, Shu'un Filistiniyya, and Al-Karmel. He was also one of the contributors of Lotus, a literary magazine financed by Egypt and the Soviet Union.

By the age of seventeen, Darwish was writing poetry about the suffering of the refugees in the Nakba and the inevitability of their return, and had begun reciting his poems at poetry festivals. Seven years later, on 1 May 1965, when the young Darwish read his poem "Bitaqat huwiyya" ["Identity Card"] to a crowd in a Nazareth movie house, there was a tumultuous reaction. Within days the poem had spread throughout the country and the Arab world. Published in his second volume "Leaves of Olives" (Haifa, 1964), the six stanzas of the poem repeat the cry "Write down: I am an Arab." In the 1970s, "Darwish, as a Palestinian poet of the Resistance committed himself to the ... objective of nurturing the vision of defeat and disaster (after the June War of 1967), so much so that it would 'gnaw at the hearts' of the forthcoming generations." Darwish addressed the Israeli invasion of Lebanon in Ward aqall [Fewer Roses] (1986) and "Sa-ya'ti barabira akharun" ("Other Barbarians Will Come").

Darwish's work has won numerous awards and been published in 20 languages. A central theme in Darwish's poetry is the concept of watan or homeland. The poet Naomi Shihab Nye wrote that Darwish "is the essential breath of the Palestinian people, the eloquent witness of exile and belonging..." Among his awards was the "Cultural Freedom Prize" by the United States Lannan Foundation, for the stated purpose of recognizing "people whose extraordinary and courageous work celebrates the human right to freedom of imagination, inquiry, and expression."

Writing style
Darwish's early writings are in the classical Arabic style. He wrote monorhymed poems adhering to the metrics of traditional Arabic poetry. In the 1970s he began to stray from these precepts and adopted a "free-verse" technique that did not abide strictly by classical poetic norms. The quasi-Romantic diction of his early works gave way to a more personal, flexible language, and the slogans and declarative language that characterized his early poetry were replaced by indirect and ostensibly apolitical statements, although politics was never far away.

Literary influences
Darwish was impressed by the Iraqi poets Abd al-Wahhab Al-Bayati and Badr Shakir al-Sayyab. He cited Arthur Rimbaud and Allen Ginsberg as literary influences. Darwish admired the Hebrew poet Yehuda Amichai, but described his poetry as a "challenge to me, because we write about the same place. He wants to use the landscape and history for his own benefit, based on my destroyed identity. So we have a competition: who is the owner of the language of this land? Who loves it more? Who writes it better?"

Political views towards Israel
Darwish is widely perceived as a Palestinian symbol and a spokesman for Arab opposition to Israel. He rejected accusations of antisemitism: "The accusation is that I hate Jews. It's not comfortable that they show me as a devil and an enemy of Israel. I am not a lover of Israel, of course. I have no reason to be. But I don't hate Jews." Darwish wrote in Arabic, and also spoke English, French, and Hebrew.

According to the Israeli author Haim Gouri, who knew him personally, Darwish's Hebrew was excellent. Four volumes of his poetry were translated into Hebrew by Muhammad Hamza Ghaneim: Bed of a Stranger (2000), Why Did You Leave the Horse Alone? (2000), State of Siege (2003), and Mural (2006). Salman Masalha, a bilingual Arabic-Hebrew writer, translated his book Memory for Forgetfulness into Hebrew.

In March 2000, Yossi Sarid, the Israeli education minister, proposed that two of Darwish's poems be included in the Israeli high school curriculum. Prime Minister Ehud Barak rejected the proposal on the grounds that the time "is not ripe" to teach Darwish in schools. It has been suggested that the incident had more to do with internal Israeli politics in trying to damage Prime Minister Ehud Barak's government than with poetry. With the death of Darwish, the debate about including his poetry in the Israeli school curriculum was re-opened in 2008.

"Although it is now technically possible for Jewish students to study Darwish, his writing is still banned from Arab schools. The curriculum used in Arab education is one agreed in 1981 by a committee whose sole Jewish member vetoed any works he thought might 'create an ill spirit'."

Darwish described Hebrew as a "language of love." He considered himself to be part of the Jewish civilization that existed in Palestine and hoped for a reconciliation between the Palestinians and the Jews. When this happens, "the Jew will not be ashamed to find an Arab element in himself, and the Arab will not be ashamed to declare that he incorporates Jewish elements."

Political activism

Darwish was a member of Rakah, the Israeli Communist Party, before joining the Palestine Liberation Organization in Beirut. In 1970 he left for Moscow. Later, he moved to Cairo in 1971 where he worked for al-Ahram daily newspaper. In Beirut, in 1973, he edited the monthly Shu'un Filistiniyya (Palestinian Affairs) and worked as a director in the Palestinian Research Center of the PLO and joined the organisation. In the wake of the Lebanon War, Darwish wrote the political poems Qasidat Beirut (1982) and Madih al-zill al'ali (1983). Darwish was elected to the PLO Executive Committee in 1987. In 1988 he wrote a manifesto intended as the Palestinian people's declaration of independence. In 1993, after the Oslo accords, Darwish resigned from the PLO Executive Committee.

Views on the peace process
Darwish consistently demanded a "tough and fair" stand in negotiations with Israel.

Despite his criticism of both Israel and the Palestinian leadership, Darwish believed that peace was attainable. "I do not despair," he told the Israeli newspaper Haaretz. "I am patient and am waiting for a profound revolution in the consciousness of the Israelis. The Arabs are ready to accept a strong Israel with nuclear arms – all it has to do is open the gates of its fortress and make peace."

1988 poem controversy
In 1988, one of his poems, "Passers Between the Passing Words", was cited in the Knesset by Yitzhak Shamir. Darwish was accused of demanding that the Jews leave Israel, although he claimed he meant the West Bank and Gaza: "So leave our land/Our shore, our sea/Our wheat, our salt, our wound". Adel Usta, a specialist on Darwish's poetry, said the poem was misunderstood and mistranslated. Poet and translator Ammiel Alcalay wrote that "the hysterical overreaction to the poem simply serves as a remarkably accurate litmus test of the Israeli psyche ... (the poem) is an adamant refusal to accept the language of the occupation and the terms under which the land is defined."

Criticism of Hamas
In 2005, outdoor music and dance performances in Qalqiliya were suddenly banned by the Hamas-led municipality, with authorities saying that such events were forbidden by Islam. The municipality also prohibited the playing of music in the Qualqiliya zoo. In response, Darwish warned that "There are Taliban-type elements in our society, and this is a very dangerous sign."

In July 2007, Darwish returned to Ramallah and visited Haifa for a festive event held in his honor; it was sponsored by Masharaf magazine and the Israeli Hadash party. To a crowd of some 2,000 people who turned out for the event, he expressed his criticism of the Hamas takeover of the Gaza Strip: "We woke up from a coma to see a monocolored flag (of Hamas) do away with the four-color flag (of Palestine)."

2016 poem controversy
In July 2016 a controversy erupted over the broadcasting of Darwish's poem "Bitaqat hawiyya" ("Identity Card") on Israeli radio station Galei Tzahal. Written in 1964, it includes the lines:

Write down: 
I am an Arab 
Robbed of my ancestors' vineyards 
And of the land cultivated 
By me and all my children. 
Nothing is left for us and my grandchildren  
Except these rocks... 
Will your government take them too, as reported? 
Therefore, 
Write at the top of page one: 
I do not hate people, 
I do not assault anyone, 
But...if I get hungry, 
I eat the flesh of my usurper. 
Beware...beware...of my hunger, 
And of my anger. 

This enraged Israel defence minister Avigdor Lieberman, who compared the poem to Hitler's Mein Kampf.

Darwish's poems in music and film
Many of Darwish's poems were set to music by Arab composers, among them Marcel Khalife, Reem Kelani, Majida El Roumi and Ahmad Qa'abour. The most notable are "Rita and the Rifle," "I lost a beautiful dream," "Birds of Galilee" and "I Yearn for my Mother's Bread." They have become anthems for at least two generations of Arabs. In the 1980s, Sabreen, a Palestinian music group in Israel, recorded an album including versions of Darwish's poems "On Man" and "On Wishes."

The composer Marcel Khalife was accused of blasphemy and insulting religious values, because of his song entitled "I am Yusuf, oh my father," which he based on Darwish's lyrics, and which cited a verse from the Qur'an. In this poem, Darwish shared the pain of Yusuf (Joseph), who was rejected by his brothers and fear him, because he is too handsome and kind. "Oh my father, I am Yusuf / Oh father, my brothers neither love me nor want me in their midst." Darwish presents the story of Joseph as an allegory for the rejection of the Palestinians by the Israelis.

Tamar Muskal, an Israeli-American composer, incorporated Darwish's "I Am From There" into her composition "The Yellow Wind," which combines a full orchestra, Arabic flute, Arabic and Israeli poetry, and themes from David Grossman's book The Yellow Wind.

In 2002, Swiss composer Klaus Huber completed a large work entitled "Die Seele muss vom Reittier steigen...", a chamber music concerto for cello, baritone and countertenor that incorporates Darwish's "The Soul Must Descend from its Mount and Walk on its Silken Feet."

In 2008, Mohammed Fairouz set selections from State of Siege to music. In his third symphony Poems and Prayers of 2012, in addition to the lyrics of Mahmoud Darwish, poems by the Arab poet Fadwa Touqan and the Israeli poet Yehuda Amichai are sounded.

In 2011, the Syrian composer Hassan Taha created the musical play "The Dice Player", based on the poems and lyrics of Mahmoud Darwish. Their premiere took place at the experimental Center for Contemporary Music Gare du Nord in Basel, Switzerland.

Inspired by the attempted suppression of Khalife's composition "I am Yusuf, oh my father," the Norwegian singer-songwriter Moddi composed a fresh melody to the poem. The song is titled "Oh my father, I am Joseph," from his 2015 album Unsongs.

In 2017, British musician Roger Waters set to music an English translation of Darwish's "Lesson From the Kama Sutra (Wait for Her)" on his album Is This the Life We Really Want? in a song titled "Wait for Her."

Representation in other media
In 1997, a documentary entitled Mahmoud Darwish was produced by French TV, directed by French-Moroccan director Simone Bitton.

Darwish appeared as himself in Jean-Luc Godard's Notre Musique (2004).

In 2008 Darwish starred in the five-screen film id – Identity of the Soul from Arts Alliance Productions, in which he narrates his poem "A Soldier Dreams of White Lilies" along with Ibsen's poem "Terje Vigen." Id was his final performance. It premiered in Palestine in October 2008, with audiences of tens of thousands. In 2010, the film was continuing an international screening tour.

In 2009 Egin, a patchanka band from Italy, published a song setting the poem "Identity Card" to music.

In 2016, his poem "We Were Without a Present" served as the basis for the central song, "Ya Reit" by Palestinian rapper Tamer Nafar in the film "Junction 48". Additionally, one of his poems was read as part of Nafar's speech during the Ophir Awards.

In 2017, his poem "Think of Others" was set to music by a South African artist and 11-year old Palestinian youth activist, Janna Jihad Ayyad.

Awards
 Lotus Prize for Literature (1969; from the Afro-Asian Writers' Association)
 Lenin Peace Prize (1983; from the USSR)
 The Knight of the Order of Arts and Letters (1993; from France)
 The Lannan Foundation Prize for Cultural Freedom (2001)
 Al Owais Award (2002–2003)
 Prince Claus Awards (2004)
 "Bosnian stećak" (2007)
 Golden Wreath of Struga Poetry Evenings (2007)
 The International Forum for Arabic Poetry prize (2007)
 The Argana International Poetry Prize (2008; from Morocco)

Death

Mahmoud Darwish died on 9 August 2008 at the age of 67, three days after heart surgery at Memorial Hermann Hospital in Houston, Texas. Before surgery, Darwish had signed a document asking not to be resuscitated in the event of brain death. According to Ibrahim Muhawi, the poet, though suffering from serious heart problems, did not require urgent surgery, and the day set for the operation bore a symbolic resonance. In his Memory for Forgetfulness, Darwish centered the narrative of Israel's invasion of Lebanon and 88-day siege of Beirut on 6 August 1982, which was the anniversary of the bombing of Hiroshima. A new bomb had been deployed, which could collapse and level a 12-storey building by creating a vacuum. Darwish wrote: "On this day, on the anniversary of the Hiroshima bomb, they are trying out the vacuum bomb on our flesh and the experiment is successful." By his choice of that day for surgery, Muwahi suggests, Darwish was documenting: "the nothingness he saw laying ahead for the Palestinian people."

Early reports of his death in the Arabic press indicated that Darwish had asked in his will to be buried in Palestine. Three locations were originally suggested; his home village of al-Birwa, the neighboring village Jadeida, where some of Darwish's family still resides, or in the West Bank city of Ramallah. Ramallah Mayor Janet Mikhail announced later that Darwish would be buried next to Ramallah's Palace of Culture, at the summit of a hill overlooking Jerusalem on the southwestern outskirts of Ramallah, and a shrine would be erected in his honor. Ahmed Darwish said "Mahmoud doesn't just belong to a family or a town, but to all the Palestinians, and he should be buried in a place, where all Palestinians can come and visit him."

Palestinian President Mahmoud Abbas declared three days of mourning to honor Darwish and he was accorded the equivalent of a State funeral. A set of four postage stamps commemorating Darwish was issued in August 2008 by the PA.

Arrangements for flying the body in from Texas delayed the funeral for a day. Darwish's body was then flown from Amman, Jordan for the burial in Ramallah. The first eulogy was delivered by Palestinian President Mahmoud Abbas to an orderly gathering of thousands. Several left-wing Knesset members attended the official ceremony; Mohammed Barakeh (Hadash) and Ahmed Tibi (United Arab List-Ta'al) stood with the family, and Dov Khenin (Hadash) and Jamal Zahalka (Balad) were in the hall at the Mukataa. Also present was the former French prime minister and poet Dominique de Villepin. After the ceremony, Darwish's coffin was taken in a cortege at walking pace from the Mukataa to the Palace of Culture, gathering thousands of followers along the way.

On 5 October 2008, the International Literature Festival Berlin held a worldwide reading in memory of Mahmoud Darwish.

Legacy
The Mahmoud Darwish Foundation was established on 4 October 2008 as a Palestinian non-profit foundation that "seeks to safeguard Mahmoud Darwish's cultural, literary and intellectual legacy." The foundation administers the annual "Mahmoud Darwish Award for Creativity" granted to intellectuals from Palestine and elsewhere. The inaugural winner of the prize, in 2010, was Egyptian novelist Ahdaf Soueif.

Published works

Poetry
 Asafir bila ajniha (Wingless birds), 1960
 Awraq Al-Zaytun (Leaves of olives), 1964
 Bitaqat huwiyya (Identity Card), 1964
 Asheeq min filasteen (A lover from Palestine), 1966
 Akhir al-layl (The end of the night), 1967
 Yawmiyyat jurh filastini (Diary of a Palestinian wound), 1969
 Habibati tanhad min nawmiha (My beloved awakens), 1969
 al-Kitabah 'ala dhaw'e al-bonduqiyah (Writing in the light of the gun), 1970
 al-'Asafir tamut fi al-jalil (Birds are Dying in Galilee), 1970
 Mahmoud Darwish works, 1971. Two volumes
 Mattar na'em fi kharif ba'eed (Light rain in a distant autumn) 1971
 Uhibbuki aw la uhibbuki (I love you, I love you not), 1972
 Jondiyyun yahlum bi-al-zanabiq al-baidaa (A soldier dreaming of white lilies), 1973
 Complete Works, 1973. Now al-A'amal al-jadida (2004) and al-A'amal al-oula (2005).
 Muhawalah raqm 7 (Attempt number 7), 1974
 Tilka suratuha wa-hadha intihar al-ashiq (That's her image, and that's the suicide of her lover), 1975
 Ahmad al-za'tar, 1976
 A'ras (Weddings), 1977
 al-Nasheed al-jasadi (The bodily anthem), 1980. Joint work
 The Music of Human Flesh, Heinemann 1980, Poems of the Palestinian struggle selected and translated by Denys Johnson-Davies
 Qasidat Bayrut (Ode to Beirut), 1982
 Madih al-zill al-'ali (A eulogy for the tall shadow), 1983
 Hissar li-mada'eh al-bahr (A siege for the sea eulogies), 1984
 Victims of a Map, 1984. Joint work with Samih al-Qasim and Adonis in English.
 Sand and Other Poems, 1986
 Hiya ughniyah, hiya ughniyah (It's a song, it's a song), 1985
 Ward aqall (Fewer roses), 1985
 Ma'asat al-narjis, malhat al-fidda (Tragedy of daffodils, comedy of silver), 1989
 Ara ma oreed (I see what I want), 1990
 Ahad 'asher kaukaban (Eleven planets), 1992
 Limadha tarakt al-hissan wahidan (Why Did You Leave the Horse Alone?), 1995. English translation 2006 by Jeffrey Sacks (Archipelago Books)
 Psalms, 1995. A selection from Uhibbuki aw la uhibbuki, translation by Ben Bennani
 Sareer al-ghariba (Bed of a stranger), 1998
 Then Palestine, 1999 (with Larry Towell, photographer, and Rene Backmann)
 Jidariyya (Mural), 2000
 The Adam of Two Edens: Selected Poems, 2000 (Syracuse University Press and Jusoor) (edited by Munir Akash and Carolyn Forche)
 Halat Hissar (State of siege), 2002
 La ta'tazer 'amma fa'alta (Don't apologize for what you did), 2004
 Unfortunately, It Was Paradise: Selected Poems, 2003. Translations by Munir Akash, Caroyln Forché and others
 al-A'amal al-jadida (The new works), 2004. A selection of Darwish's recent works
 al-A'amal al-oula (The early works), 2005. Three volumes, a selection of Darwish's early works
 Ka-zahr el-lawz aw ab'ad (Almond blossoms and beyond), 2005
 The Butterfly's Burden, 2007 (Copper Canyon Press) (translation by Fady Joudah)

Prose
 Shai'on 'an al-wattan (Something about the homeland), 1971
 Youmiat muwaten bala watan (Diary of a Citizen without a Country), 1971, translated as The Palestinian Chalk Circle  
 Wada'an ayatuha al-harb, wada'an ayuha al-salaam (Farewell, war, farewell, peace), 1974
 Yawmiyyat al-hozn al-'aadi (Diary of the usual sadness), 1973 (Turkish translation, 2009 by Hakan Özkan)
 Dhakirah li-al-nisyan (Memory for Forgetfulness), 1987. English translation 1995 by Ibrahim Muhawi
 Fi wasf halatina (Describing our condition), 1987
 al-Rasa'il (The Letters), 1990. Joint work with Samih al-Qasim
 Aabiroon fi kalamen 'aaber (Bypassers in bypassing words), 1991
 Fi hadrat al-ghiyab (In the presence of absence), 2006
 Athar alfarasha (A River Dies of Thirst: journals), 2009 (Archipelago Books) (translated by Catherine Cobham)

Reviews
 Miller, Kevin (1975), review of Selected Poems, in Calgacus 1, Winter 1975, p. 59,

See also
 Palestinian literature
 Arabic poetry
 Abd al-Karim al-Karmi

References

Further reading

External links

Mahmoud Darwish at Poetry Foundation

Essay on Mahmound Darwish at Thought Catalog

 Hour-long radio program from Voices of the Middle East

Collection of Darwish poems
 

Five Darwish poems at Poemhunter.com

Poem by Darwish at the Virginia Quarterly Review

 In Jerusalem
 I Belong There
Poems Found In Translation another translation of I belong there
 Mahmoud Darwish -Abiroun
 Oh My Father, I am Yusif
Mahmoud Darwish's Last Volume of Poetry: A Palestinian Throws the Dice

1941 births
2008 deaths
21st-century Palestinian poets
Palestinian communists
Palestinian Muslims
Lenin Peace Prize recipients
Struga Poetry Evenings Golden Wreath laureates
Palestinian non-fiction writers
Palestinian refugees
20th-century Palestinian poets
20th-century non-fiction writers
Members of the Executive Committee of the Palestine Liberation Organization